My Way is a 2011 South Korean war film produced, co-written and directed by Kang Je-gyu. It stars Jang Dong-gun, alongside Japanese actor Joe Odagiri and Chinese actress Fan Bingbing.

This film is based on the story of a Korean named Yang Kyoungjong who was allegedly captured by the American Army on D-Day. Yang Kyoungjong was conscripted into the Japanese Imperial Army, the Red Army, and the Wehrmacht.

Plot

The year is 1928 in Gyeong-seong (present-day Seoul), Korea. Young Kim Jun-shik (Shin Sang-yeob), his father (Chun Ho-jin) and sister Eun-soo (Lee Yeon-hee) work on the farm of the Hasegawa family (Shiro Sano, Kumi Nakamura) in Japanese-occupied Korea. Both Jun-shik and young Tatsuo Hasegawa (Sung Yu-bin) are interested in running. When they are teenagers (Do Ji-han, Yukichi Kobayashi), they have become fierce competitors. Tatsuo's grandfather (Isao Natsuyagi) is killed in a bomb attack by a Korean freedom fighter, and a Korean runner, Sohn Kee-chung (Yoon Hee-won), then wins a marathon race against Japanese competitors, which further inflames Korean-Japanese tensions.

In May 1938, Jun-shik (Jang Dong-gun) is working as a rickshaw runner. Koreans have been banned from taking part in sports events, and Tatsuo (Joe Odagiri), now a fierce Japanese nationalist, has sworn that a Korean will never again win a race. He has been accepted by a medical college in Berlin, but Tatsuo decides to stay in Korea to run in the All Japan Trials for the marathon. Sohn secretly backs Jun-shik, who wins the race, but Tatsuo is awarded the medal when Jun-shik is disqualified for allegedly cheating. A riot by Korean spectators ensues, and as punishment, those who started the riot are forcibly drafted into the Japanese Army, including Jun-shik and his friend Lee Jong-dae (Kim In-kwon), who has a crush on Eun-soo.

In July 1939, they find themselves, along with 100 other Koreans, in the battle at Nomonhan, on the border with Mongolia, where a Chinese sniper, Shirai (Fan Bingbing), avenging the deaths of her family at the hands of the Japanese, is captured and tortured. Tatsuo, now a colonel, arrives and takes command and forces the existing commander, who is far fairer to the Koreans, Takakura (高倉; Shingo Tsurumi), to commit seppuku. After refusing to join a suicide squad, organized by Tatsuo, to fight the Soviets, Jun-shik is imprisoned with Shirai but escapes with her, Jong-dae, and two other friends to the River Khalkhin. Jun-shik, seeing the tanks on the horizon, attempt to return to base to warn the Japanese forces. During his return, he is attacked by a Soviet I-16 Ishak, and is saved by Shirai, who dies after shooting down the plane. Jun-shik returns to the base and manages to warn the Japanese forces that a large-scale Soviet tank attack is coming, but Tatsuo refuses to order a retreat. During the one-sided battle, a tank shell explodes near Tatsuo and Jun-shik, which knocks them unconscious.

In February 1940, Jun-shik and Tatsuo end up in Kungursk prisoner-of-war camp north of Perm, in the Soviet Union, in which both Koreans and Japanese are incarcerated together. Under the name of Anton, Jong-dae has become a work-unit leader, helps his Korean friends, and abuses the Japanese, but it becomes clear that his ultimate allegiance now lies with the Soviets. Jun-shik humiliates Tatsuo in a sanctioned fight to the death, but Jun-shik suddenly refuses to kill Tatsuo, and both get punished together. Later, a work accident incites a riot, which nearly leads to the execution of Tatsuo and Jun-shik by firing squad, but news comes that Germany has declared war on the Soviet Union. The Soviets immediately conscript the prisoners-of-war and shoot those who refuse or are too slow to don the Red Army uniform. Jong-dae volunteers Jun-shik and Tatsuo, still tied to the stakes, into the Red Army, which saves their lives. They all fight in a bloody battle against the German army at Dedovsk in December 1941. Jong-dae dies leading the prisoners to battle, but Tatsuo and Jun-shik manage to survive. Jun-shik convinces Tatsuo to don German military apparel taken from bodies and trek over the mountains into German territory. As they travel, it becomes clear that Tatsuo has been injured. They come upon an abandoned town in which Jun-shik goes out to find medicine to give to Tatsuo. During his search, Jun-shik is found by German soldiers. Unable to understand him, they capture him. Meanwhile, the dying Tatsuo is found by soldiers searching the house he was placed in.

Three years later, Tatsuo is part of the German Army. He finds himself on the beaches of Normandy, France, just prior to the D-Day invasion by the Allies. As the army fortifies the beaches, Tatsuo sees a man running on the beach. He catches up to him and sees that it is Jun-shik. It is apparent that they have not seen each other since their capture by the Germans. They decide to run away from Normandy to catch a ship in Cherbourg which rumored to safely sail out of the theater, and ultimately to return home to Korea. As they attempt to leave, the Normandy Landings begin. Jun-shik and Tatsuo are locked into a machine-gun pillbox by a German officer. The two force open the door and emerge to a scene of chaos, with American soldiers overrunning the beach. They run inland, but Jun-shik is wounded by a bomb fragment in the chest and bleeds profusely. Noticing American paratroopers approaching, the dying Jun-shik forcibly replaces Tatsuo's identification tags with his own and tells Tatsuo, "He is now Jun-shik." Otherwise, since Tatsuo is Japanese and considered a sworn enemy of the Americans, he could be killed on the spot.

Soon afterwards, Jun-Shik dies and Tatsuo cries aloud as the Americans close in. Tatsuo is later seen sprinting towards the finish in the 1948 Olympic games as "Jun-Shik Kim." The film ends with a flashback of their first encounter back in Gyeong-seong. He monologues that when he encountered Jun-Shik as a child, he was secretly happy to have found someone who could be his running mate.

Cast
 Jang Dong-gun – Kim Jun-shik
 Joe Odagiri – Tatsuo Hasegawa (長谷川 辰雄 Hasegawa Tatsuo)
 Fan Bingbing – Shirai
 Kim In-kwon – Lee Jong-dae
 Lee Yeon-hee – Kim Eun-soo
 Yoon Hee-won – Sohn Kee-chung
 Chun Ho-jin – Kim Joon-sik's father
 Isao Natsuyagi – Tatsuo's grandfather

Soundtrack
Andrea Bocelli – To Find My Way

Production
This is the first film Kang Je-gyu directed after taking a 7-year hiatus. Kang first received the original screenplay by writer Kim Byung-in (also known as Justin Kim) the working title D-Day in 2007 and then after watching a Korean documentary on the subject decided to turn the script into a film in 2008. The production lasted eight months from October 2010 to June 2011, with locations in Latvia and Korea (Hapcheon, Cheongoksan National Park in Gangwon Province, Saemangeum Seawall).
The Soviet BT-5 and BT-7 tanks in the film were copies built on the chassis of British FV432 APCs.

Reception
It encountered stronger than expected competition from Mission: Impossible – Ghost Protocol, released on 15 December, and it also received a lukewarm response from viewers. From its release 21 December to the end of the year, My Way sold 1.58 million tickets – only a small fraction of what it would have needed in order to break even.

The film was nominated in the category of "Best International Film" for the 39th Saturn Awards but lost against Headhunters.

References

External links

  
 
 

Films set in Korea under Japanese rule
2011 action drama films
2011 films
2010s action war films
South Korean action drama films
South Korean war drama films
2010s Korean-language films
2010s Japanese-language films
Chinese-language films
2011 multilingual films
World War II films
Running films
Films directed by Kang Je-gyu
CJ Entertainment films
Japan in non-Japanese culture
2010s South Korean films